MEX or Mex may refer to:

Places
 Mexico, a country in the southern portion of North America
 State of Mexico
 Mexico City
 Mexico City International Airport, IATA airport code MEX
 Mex, Valais, Switzerland
 Mex, Vaud, Switzerland
 Mexborough railway station, England, station code MEX
 Maju Expressway (MEX), an expressway in Kuala Lumpur, Malaysia

People
 Mex Urtizberea (born 1960), Argentine musician and actor
 Byron Johnson (baseball) (1911–2005), also known as Mex Johnson, American baseball player

Other uses
 Mex (mathematics), in game theory
 MEX (windowing system), computer software
 MEX file, a type of C/C++ or FORTRAN source code in MATLAB scripts
 Mars Express, a space exploration mission 
 Boyd Martin Theatre, or The MeX, in The Kentucky Center, Louisville, Kentucky, U.S.